Cheondeungsan (천등산 / 天登山)  is a mountain of Jeollanam-do, in western South Korea. It has an elevation of 550 metres.

See also
List of mountains of Korea

References

Mountains of South Jeolla Province
Goheung County
Mountains of South Korea